Umuezeala became an autonomous community springing from the Ogboko autonomous community in Ideato South LGA of Imo State, Nigeria.

Umuezeala villages include: 
Umuopara
Umueze1 and 2
Umuezeala Ama
Umudim 
One of the prominent families in Umuoparanyru is the "Ogueri" family.

Imo State
Towns in Imo State